DBZ may refer to:

dBZ (meteorology), decibels of Z, a meteorological measure of equivalent reflectivity (Z) of a radar signal
dB(Z), zero-weighted decibel
Dean Zelinsky (born 1957), American guitar designer and founder of DBZ Guitars
Dragon Ball Z, the anime adaptation of the second portion of the Dragon Ball manga
Dolderbahn, a rack railway in the city of Zürich, Switzerland
Division by zero, a term used in mathematics if the divisor (denominator) is zero